Bishop John M. D’Arcy Stadium is a 3,500-seat multi-purpose stadium in Fort Wayne, Indiana. The facility is located on the campus of the University of Saint Francis and is named in honor of Bishop John M. D’Arcy,  who served as diocesan bishop of the Diocese of Fort Wayne-South Bend, Indiana.

The stadium is primarily used for American football and soccer. It is home to the Saint Francis Cougars football and soccer teams.

The facility opened in 1998 when the Cougars played their first season of football.  At that time, it was referred to as Cougar Stadium.  In 2003, the stadium was given its present name to honor the then-current bishop of the local Catholic diocese, John M. D'Arcy.

Major renovations
In 2004, the field at the stadium became the first collegiate field in Indiana to utilize Sporturf.  The innovative surface is said to be faster and safer than artificial surfaces previously used at sports venues.

In 2012, lights were added to the stadium thanks to the generosity of local businessman Bruce Dye.

Stadium facilities

Tom Jehl Football Complex
Located under the west side (home) stands, the Tom Jehl Football Complex is a building that houses the home locker room and the offices for the football program.  The complex was named after local businessman and benefactor Thomas Jehl.

Kevin Donley Field
On September 23, 2006, in pregame ceremonies to recognize a lifetime of coaching achievements, Saint Francis named its football field after Head Coach Kevin Donley.

R. Bruce Dye Football Training Center

References

College football venues
College soccer venues in the United States
Saint Francis Cougars football
American football venues in Indiana
Soccer venues in Indiana
Multi-purpose stadiums in the United States
Buildings and structures in Fort Wayne, Indiana